Hobbs Kessler (born 15 March 2003) is an American middle and long-distance runner. He competes professionally for Adidas, having turned professional directly after high school. He holds the North American U20 record in the 1500 meters, having run 3:34.36 at the Portland Track Festival in May 2021. He also holds the American high school record for the indoor mile, with a time of 3:57.66 set in February 2021. He was named the 2021 Gatorade National Track and Field Athlete of the Year. Prior his breakout running year, Hobbs was a world-class rock climber. He's stated that one of his goals is to be the first person to run a sub-four-minute mile, climb a 5.15 and a V15.

Rock Climbing 
Kessler was an outstanding rock climber growing up. He represented the United States many time including at the 2019 IFSC Climbing Youth World Championships in Arco, Italy where he placed 34th in the Lead Youth A Male category. In March 2019, he climbed Southern Smoke (5.14c) at Red River Gorge in Kentucky — his hardest route so far.

High School Career 
Kessler competed for Skyline High school in Ann Arbor, Michigan. His senior year his father was the high school track coach but wanted to keep a parent relationship with his son so he had legendary University of Michigan coach Ron Warhurst coach most of Hobbs training. This allowed Hobbs to train with professional runners Nick Willis and Mason Ferlic, while still running the easier days with his high school teammates.

In September of 2021 Hobbs committed to compete collegially at Northern Arizona University.

On February 7, 2021 Kessler broke the U.S. high school indoor mile record by running 3:57.66 at the Randal Tyson Track Center where he placed third in the race. this broke his previous mile PR more more than ten seconds. He was the 12th American High schoolers to break 4 minutes in the mile.That outdoor season he won his first state title by winning the 1600m. On March 27 he ran 8:39.04 for 2-miles at the NSAF USA Meet of Champions in Myrtle Beach, becoming the No. 4 American high schooler at that distance.

Professional Career 
On May 29, 2021 Hobbs ran 3:34.36 1500m at the Portland track festival. While still not enrolled in college yet, his time was faster than the NCAA Record. This made him re-think his future and in June 2021, only a day before he competed at the U.S. Olympic trials,  Hobbs announced that he signed a professional contact with Adidas and would not compete for Northern Arizona.

Kessler currently trains under Ron Warhurst in Ann Arbor as part of the Very Nice Track Club. His training partners include olympians Nick Willis and Mason Ferlic, as well as other professional runners Ben Flanagan, Morgan Beadlescomb, Nathan Mylenek, Natalie Cizmas, Alsu Lenneman, and Charlie Da’Vall Grice.

Personal bests

Personal Life 
Hobbs comes from a family of runners. His father, Michael, ran collegially at Eastern Michigan university. His mother, Serena, also is a runner and made the 2012 US Olympic Trials in the marathon.

References

External links
 

2003 births
Living people
American male middle-distance runners
American male long-distance runners
Sportspeople from Ann Arbor, Michigan
21st-century American people

Track and field athletes from Michigan